S/Z, published in 1970, is Roland Barthes' structural analysis of "Sarrasine", the short story by Honoré de Balzac. Barthes methodically moves through the text of the story, denoting where and how different codes of meaning function. Barthes' study made a major impact on literary criticism and is historically located at the crossroads of structuralism and post-structuralism.

Relation to structuralism 

Barthes's analysis is influenced by the structuralist linguistics of Ferdinand de Saussure; both Barthes and Saussure aim to explore and demystify the link between a sign and its meaning. But Barthes moves beyond structuralism in that he criticises the propensity of narratology to establish the overall system out of which all individual narratives are created, which makes the text lose its specificity (différance) (I). Barthes uses five specific "codes" that thematically, semiotically/semiologically, and otherwise make a literary text reflect structures that are interwoven, but not in a definite way that closes the meaning of the text (XII). Barthes insists on the (different degrees of) plurality of a text — a plurality that should not be reduced by any privileged interpretation. He also flags the way in which the reader is an active producer of interpretations of the text, rather than a passive consumer. (II).

Codes 
Barthes defines five codes that define a network (or a topos) that form a space of meaning that the text runs through. But these codes and their mutual relations are not clear structures, and do not close the multivariance of the text. Thus, Barthes defines the code vaguely: Each of the units of the text marks a virtual digression toward a catalogue of other units. Each code also appears as voices that altogether weave the text, though each of them for a while may dominate the text. (XII)

Two of the codes are sequential and structure the text in an irreversible way (XV): The hermeneutic code (HER) denotes an enigma that moves the narrative forward; it sets up delays and obstacles that maintain suspense.  The proairetic (ACT) code organises (small) intertwined sequences of behaviors, each sequence has its own regularity that does not follow the narrative's logic (though it is used in it). (XI)

The rest of the codes are reversible (XV). Two of them structure the text: The semic code (SEM) designates a special kind of signifiers (e.g. person, place, object) to which adhere unstable meanings and that enable the development of a theme through the story. (XI, LXXXI)  The symbolic code (SYM) are meanings that are constitutive (stemming from the fields of rhetoric, sexuality, or economy), but cannot be represented in the text, except in metonymies, which renders the text open to different interpretations (XI, XCII).

The last, cultural code (REF) refers to meanings external to the text: in science or wisdom (sagesse). (XI)

Barthes does not provide an overall structure for how the codes are integrated because he wants to preserve the plurality (multivalence) of the text. Since reading is plural (IX), a different reading (reader) might invoke the codes differently and combine them differently ending up with a different understanding. Moreover, whereas the classical text tends to enforce a particular model of integrating the codes, the modern plural text does not. (XII)

As Barthes guides the reader through the entirety of Balzac’s text, he systematically notes and explains the usage of each of these codes as they occur. He also offers a more academic outline of the text in Annex 3.

Hermeneutic Code: the mysteries of the text
The hermeneutic code is associated with enigmas of the text, puzzles and mysteries that the text may or may not eventually answer but will most likely defer and misdirect that answer, keeping the reader guessing. When Barthes identifies an enigma in the text he marks it HER (short for hermeneutic). The process of revealing truth by solving enigmas is further broken down in the following sequence (LXXXIX):
Thematisation. What in the narrative is an enigma?
Positioning. Additional confirmations of the enigma.
Formulation of the enigma.
Promise of an answer of the enigma.
Fraud. Circumvention of the true answer.
Equivocation. Mixture of fraud and truth.
Blocking. The enigma cannot be solved.
Suspended answer. Stopping the answering after having begun. 
Partial answer. Some facets of the truth are revealed.
Disclosure of the truth.
Because the hermeneutic code involves a move from a question to an answer it is one of the two codes (the other being the proairetic or action code) which Barthes calls “irreversible” (XV): Once a secret is revealed, it cannot be unrevealed—the moment of cognition is permanent for the reader. Compared to the detailed sequential actions of the proairetic code, the hermeneutic code encompasses bigger questions about the entire narrative or situation of the story.

Proairetic Code: the narrative drive of the text
The proairetic code encompasses the actions or small sequences of the narrative (Annex 2) which creates narrative tension. By telling us that someone 'had been sleeping', we now anticipate them waking up, thus creating a small structure of narrative tension and expectation. Out of these units, the whole narrative has a forward drive. This is connected with Barthes' notion of the “readerly” text. The reader assimilates distinct pieces of information in a prescribed order. Even acts of psychological introspection in the novel are classified by the reader in terms of the occurrence of movements or activities. Thus, the proairetic code constitutes the text as a location with spatial and temporal dimensions through which the reader moves.

Semic Code: the resonances of the text
The semic code concerns meaning but at the level of connotation in relation to character, that is the meanings beyond the 'literal' denotation of the words: the resonances, additional linguistic associations associated with character.  The semic code will thus work to construct an evolving character through signifiers like name, costume, physical appearance, psychological traits, speech, and lexis, which may also have different connotations in different contexts elsewhere in the story.

Symbolic Code: the symbolic structure of the text
The symbolic code produces a structure of (often paired) symbolic meanings that accumulate throughout the text to establish a larger structure in which the meanings of the story unfold. These symbolic clusters of meanings might be around such oppositions as male/female, inside/outside, hidden/revealed, hot/cold. Some of the key symbolic processes in Sarrasine, according to Barthes, are (1) rhetorical (transgression of the rhetorical figure: antitheses), (2) sexual (transgression of the sex: castration), and (3) economic (transgression of the origin of wealth) (XCII). This structure is not itself stable and the work of the 'writerly' reader is to pursue these structures until they begin to break down, a symbolic collapse that is a key part of the pleasures of the text.

Cultural Code: the background knowledge of the text
The cultural code is constituted by the points at which the text refers to common bodies of knowledge. These might be agreed, shared knowledge (the real existence of the Faubourg Saint-Honoré) or an assertion of axiomatic truths (the assertion in the first sentence that all men daydream at parties, no matter how lively the party is). He calls the latter a 'gnomic code'.

Voices

The five codes together constitute a way of interpreting the text which suggests that textuality is interpretive; that the codes are not superimposed upon the text, but rather approximate something intrinsic to the text.  The analogy Barthes uses to clarify the relationship of codes to text is to the relationship between a performance and the commentary that can be heard off-stage.  In the “stereographic space” created by the codes, each code becomes associated with a voice.  To the proairetic code Barthes assigns the Voice of Empirics; to the semic the Voice of the Person; to the cultural the Voice of Science; to the hermeneutic the Voice of Truth; and to the symbolic the Voice of Symbol.

Critique 
Barthes endeavours to set up a primary structure of character relations in "Sarrasine" along the lines of gender. However, he subsequently defines the characters not in relation to biological gender, but rather along what he calls the “axis of castration.” The initial categorisation of the characters in phallic terms (the men who are the phallus, the women who have the phallus, and the ambiguous group of the androgynous and the castrated) gives way to the division he later constructs between the castrated and castrating, the passive and active. Furthermore, Barthes’ structuralist analysis exposes the fact that Balzac’s text has multiple signifiers that do not refer to one fixed signified. For example, Barthes is fascinated by the nuance of the double entendre, which most clearly fractures the traditional conception of signification: this play on words proffers two distinct and incompatible meanings that must be entertained simultaneously by the reader. The title S/Z refers to the clash between the ‘S’ of ‘Sarrasine,’ the male protagonist of the work, and the ‘Z’ of ‘Zambinella,’ the castrato with whom Sarrasine falls in love.  Sarrasine is an artist who, functioning under the assumption that all beauty is feminine, regards Zambinella as the epitome of beauty, and therefore as the paradigm of femininity.  Sarrasine’s Pygmalion-like sculpted image of the “female” La Zambinella accordingly represents the “complete woman.”  This “masterpiece,” however, is highly problematic given its original starting point as a male body — and its refashioning into a female one through the psychological projections and artistic expertise of a man.  What ultimately grounds the text is the fundamental destabilisation caused by Zambinella’s anatomy, which is perceived by Sarrasine as masterpiece, origin, and referent: in Zambinella, therefore, lies Sarrasine’s own potential for castration.

Bibliography 
"Roland Barthes' Narratology" By: Whitehead, Frank; Cambridge Quarterly, 1992; 21 (1): 41-64. (journal article)
"S/Z"   By: Coward, Rosalind; pp. 176–81 IN: Newton, K. M. (ed.); Twentieth-Century Literary Theory: A Reader. New York, NY: St. Martin's; 1997. xix, 306 pp. (book article)
"Something for Nothing: Barthes in the Text of Ideology"   By: Elmer, Jonathan; Qui Parle: Literature, Philosophy, Visual Arts, History, 1987 Spring; 1 (2): 48-61. (journal article)
"Serre S/Z ine"   By: Evrard, Franck; Nouvelle Revue Francaise, 1993 July-Aug; 486-487: 190-203. (journal article)
"S/Z, Realism, and Compulsory Heterosexuality"   By: Knight, Diana; pp. 120–36 IN: Cohen, Margaret (ed.); Prendergast, Christopher (ed.); Spectacles of Realism: Body, Gender, Genre. Minneapolis: U of Minnesota P; 1995. xiii, 363 pp. (book article)
"The Tenor of 'Sarrasine'"   By: Kolb, Katherine; PMLA: Publications of the Modern Language Association of America, 2005 Oct; 120 (5): 1560-75. (journal article)
"S/Z: Barthes' Castration Camp and the Discourse of Polarity"   By: Lambert, Deborah G.; Modern Language Studies, 1986 Summer; 16 (3): 161-171. (journal article)
"Le S/Z de Barthes: Fiction ou interprétation?"   By: Mozet, Nicole; Magazine Littéraire, 1999 Feb; 373: 62. (journal article)
"Castrati, Balzac, and Barthes' S/Z"   By: Noble, Yvonne; Comparative Drama, 1997 Spring; 31 (1): 28-41. (journal article)
"Myth and the Writerly in Roland Barthes"   By: Racker, David; Proceedings of the Philological Association of Louisiana, 1992; 127-32. (journal article)
"S/Z Revisited"   By: Reid, Martine; Yale Journal of Criticism: Interpretation in the Humanities, 2001 Fall; 14 (2): 447-52. (journal article)
"Castration, Speech Acts, and the Realist Difference: S/Z' versus 'Sarrasine'"   By: Petrey, Sandy; PMLA: Publications of the Modern Language Association of America, 1987 Mar; 102 (2): 153-65. (journal article)
"Sign, Seme, and the Psychological Character: Some Thoughts on Roland Barthes' S/Z and the Realist Novel"   By: Scheiber, Andrew J.; Journal of Narrative Technique, 1991 Fall; 21 (3): 262-73. (journal article)
"What Barthes Couldn't Say: On the Curious Occultation of Homoeroticism in S/Z"   By: Stewart, Philip; Paragraph: A Journal of Modern Critical Theory, 2001 Mar; 24 (1): 1-16. (journal article)
"When S/Z Becomes a Text"   By: Zimmermann, Eléonore M.; Gradiva: International Journal of Italian Literature'', 1987; 4 (1 [5]): 40-47. (journal article)

1970 non-fiction books
Books about literary theory
Books by Roland Barthes
French literary criticism
French non-fiction books